Phantasmarana boticariana is a species of frog in the family Hylodidae. It is endemic to southeastern Brazil and only known from few specimens from its type locality,  in Atibaia, São Paulo state.

It was formerly placed in the genus Megaelosia, but was reclassified to Phantasmarana in 2021.

Description
The snout is rounded. The tympanum is small but distinct, despite being partly covered by the supratympanic fold. The finger and the toe tips are slightly enlarged. Toes hava basal webbing and extensive fringes. Skin is smooth but bne specimen has large, sparse warts on the dorsolateral parts of its body. The dorsum is yellowish-brown or green. There are many, small yellow blotches on the belly and the throat. The limbs are barred. The iris is copper with fine, black reticulation.

Habitat and conservation
Tadpoles were collected from deeper pools.

This species is potentially threatened by habitat loss caused by fire and human settlement. The type locality is a protected area.

References 

boticariana
Endemic fauna of Brazil
Amphibians of Brazil
Amphibians described in 1998
Taxonomy articles created by Polbot